Cahuenga (also Cabeugna, Kowanga, Kawengha and Cabuenga) or "place of the hill" is a former Tongva and Tataviam (Fernandeño - Gabrieleño) Native American settlement in the San Fernando Valley of Los Angeles, Los Angeles County, California.

Its precise location is unknown. It was located near the Mission San Fernando Rey de España.

The name was used for the historic Mexican land grant Rancho Cahuenga.

The name survives in Cahuenga Pass between the Valley and Hollywood, Cahuenga Boulevard, and Campo de Cahuenga in Studio City, California, where the Treaty of Cahuenga was signed.

In a 2019 map, the village was placed near the Valley Village neighborhood in Los Angeles.

See also
Tongva
Tataviam
Tongva language
California mission clash of cultures
Ranchos of California
Spanish missions in California
Category: Tongva populated places

References

Tongva
Former Native American populated places in California
Native American populated places
Former populated places in California
San Fernando Valley
Tongva populated places